Nes Municipality in the Faroe Islands comprises three villages, Nes, Toftir and Saltnes.

References

External links
 Nes Municipality

Municipalities of the Faroe Islands
Eysturoy